Karl Babor (23 August 1918 – 18 January 1964) was a Nazi, SS doctor of the Third Reich, and officer at Camp Gross-Rosen with the rank of Hauptsturmführer. He was an expert in assassination by syringe of phenol.

Biography 
In 1945, he was arrested and taken prisoner by the French, and spent several months in a camp before being returned to Vienna, Austria. He finished his studies without being arrested until 1952, the date at which he was identified by former deportees at Grossrosen. Fleeing, he left Vienna and Austria, and was later found in Ethiopia. In the meantime, his wife returned to Germany and decided to denounce him, contacted Simon Wiesenthal, who alerted the world press (1963).

He died without being found: his body was recovered in January 1964 from a river infested with crocodiles. Police found that he had a self-inflected gunshot wound to his head.

References

Physicians in the Nazi Party
SS-Hauptsturmführer
1918 births
1964 suicides
Waffen-SS personnel
Gross-Rosen concentration camp personnel

Suicides by firearm in Ethiopia
Nazis who committed suicide